Colvin Lake is a lake in Berrien County, in the U.S. state of Michigan.

Colvin Lake was named after Absalom Colvin, a pioneer citizen.

References

Lakes of Berrien County, Michigan